In philosophy of language, Metadiscourse is the discussion about a discussion, as opposed to a simple discussion about a given topic. Metadiscourse contained within a written work can be any phrase that is included within a clause or sentence that goes beyond the subject itself, often to examine the purpose of the sentence or a response from the author, usually as an introductory adverbial clause.  Metadiscourse often includes phrases such as "frankly," "after all," "on the other hand," "to our surprise," and so on.

Below are some examples of metadiscourse in writing, denoting:
 the writer's intentions: "to sum up," "candidly," "I believe"
 the writer's confidence: "may," "perhaps," "certainly," "must"
 directions to the reader: "note that," "finally," "therefore," "however"
 the structure of the text: "first," "second," "finally," "therefore," "however"

Further reading 
 Ken Hyland: Metadiscourse. Exploring Interaction in Writing. Continuum, London 2007, .
 Annelie Ädel: Metadiscourse in L1 and L2 English. John Benjamins Publishing Company, Philadelphia/Amsterdam, 2006. .
 Ciler Hatipoglu, Erdem Akbas, Yasemin Bayyurt: Metadiscourse in Written Genres: Uncovering Textual and Interactional Aspects of Texts. Peter Lang, Frankfurt am Main, Bern, Bruxelles, New York, Oxford, Warszawa, Wien, 2017 .

Metaphilosophy